Emirates Air Line may refer to:

Emirates (airline), a state-owned airline based in Dubai
London Cable Car, a cable car link over the Thames River formerly named the Emirates Air Line